George Gardner may refer to:

 George R. Gardner (1837–1897), American politician
 George Gardner (coach) (1898–1974), American football and basketball coach
 George Gardner (botanist) (1810–1849), Scottish naturalist
 George Gardner (ice hockey) (1942–2006), Canadian goaltender
 George Washington Gardner (1778–1838), whaleship captain, member of the Gardner whaling family
 George Gardiner (boxer) (1877–1954), American boxer, also known as "George Gardner"
 George Gardner (priest) (1853–1925), English Anglican priest
 George Gardiner (settler) (1608/1615–1677), founding settler of Newport, Rhode Island, also known as "George Gardner"
 George W. Gardner (1834–1911), 28th and 30th mayor of Cleveland

See also
 
 George Gardiner (disambiguation)